Upon the outbreak of World War I, Ukraine was not an independent political entity or state. The majority of the territory that makes up the modern country of Ukraine was part of the Russian Empire with a notable far western region administered by the Austro-Hungarian Empire, and the border between them dating to the Congress of Vienna in 1815.

Ukraine's role in the prelude to the war

Towards the latter 19th century, both the Russian and Austro-Hungarian Empires attempted to exert their influence on the adjacent territory on the tide of rising national awareness of the period as borders did not undermine the ethnic composition of Europe. The Russian Empire viewed Ukrainians as Little Russians and had the support of the large Russophile community among the Ukrainian and Ruthenians population in Galicia. Austria, on the contrary, supported the late-19th century rise in Ukrainian Nationalism. Western Ukraine was a major standoff for the Balkans and the Slavic Orthodox population it harboured.

A Balkan war between Austria-Hungary and Serbia was considered inevitable, as Austria-Hungary’s influence waned and the Pan-Slavic movement grew. The rise of ethnic nationalism coincided with the growth of Serbia, where anti-Austrian sentiment was perhaps most fervent. Austria-Hungary had occupied the former Ottoman province of Bosnia-Herzegovina, which had a large Serb population, in 1878. It was formally annexed by Austria-Hungary in 1908. Increasing nationalist sentiment also coincided with the decline of the Ottoman Empire. Russia supported the Pan-Slavic movement, motivated by ethnic and religious loyalties and a rivalry with Austria dating back to the Crimean War. Recent events such as the failed Russian-Austrian treaty and a century-old dream of a warm water port also motivated St. Petersburg.

Religion also played a key role in the standoff.  When Russia and Austria partitioned Poland at the end of the 18th century, they inherited largely Eastern-rite Catholic populations. Russia went to great lengths to revert the population to Orthodoxy, at times forcibly (as took place in Chelm)

The final factor was that by 1914, Ukrainian nationalism had matured to a point where it could significantly influence the future of the region.  As a result of this nationalism and of the other main sources of Russo-Austrian confrontations, including Polish and Romanian lands, both empires eventually lost these disputed territories when these territories formed new, independent states according to Ivan Rudnytsky.

Outbreak

The Russian advance into Galicia began in August 1914. During the offensive, the Russian army successfully pushed the Austrians right up to the Carpathian ridge effectively capturing all of the lowland territory, and fulfilling their long aspirations of annexing the territory.

Ukrainians were split into two separate and opposing armies. 3.5 million fought with the Imperial Russian Army, while 250,000 fought for the Austro-Hungarian Army. Many Ukrainians thus ended up fighting each other. Also, many Ukrainian civilians suffered as armies shot and killed them after accusing them of collaborating with opposing armies (see Ukrainian Austrian internment).

Ukraine after the Russian Revolution of 1917

During World War I the western Ukrainian people were situated between Austria-Hungary and Russia. Ukrainian villages were regularly destroyed in the crossfire. Ukrainians could be found participating on both sides of the conflict. In Galicia, over twenty thousand Ukrainians who were suspected of being sympathetic to Russian interests were arrested and placed in Austrian concentration camps, both in Talerhof, Styria and in Terezín fortress (now in the Czech Republic).

The brutality did not end with the end of the First World War for Ukrainians. Fighting actually escalated with the beginning of the Russian Revolution of 1917. The revolution began a civil war within the Russian Empire and much of the fighting took place in the Ukrainian provinces. Many atrocities occurred during the civil war as the Red, White, Polish, Ukrainian, and allied armies marched throughout the country.

There were couple of attempts during this period when the Ukrainians successfully established their own state. One was with the capital in Kyiv and the other in Lviv, but neither one of them gained enough support in the international community and they both failed.

The 1919 Treaty of Versailles secured the borders of Ukrainian land after those of other European countries. In the West, Galicia and western Volhynia were left to Poland. The Kingdom of Romania gained the province of Bukovina. Czechoslovakia secured the former lands of  Austria-Hungary, Uzhhorod and Mukachevo. The remaining central and eastern Ukrainian provinces were left to the brotherly Soviet Union. As a result of World War I and the Russian Civil War, Ukrainian nationalists looked on as their attempt to attain statehood crumbled in favor of other countries' territorial expansion when 1.5 million had died in the recent fighting.

With the end of World War I the Ukrainian national movement went underground.

See also
 Galician Protocol

References

Further reading

External links
 Der Vormarsch der Flieger Abteilung 27 in der Ukraine (The advance of Flight Squadron 27 in the Ukraine). This portfolio, comprising 263 photographs mounted on 48 pages, is a photo-documentary of the German occupation and military advances through the southern Ukraine in the spring and summer of 1918.

Wars involving Ukraine
World War I
Austria-Hungary in World War I
Russian Empire in World War I
World War I by country
World War I